Prosaposin, also known as PSAP, is a protein which in humans is encoded by the PSAP gene.

This highly conserved glycoprotein is a precursor for 4 cleavage products: saposins A, B, C, and D. Saposin is an acronym for Sphingolipid Activator PrO[S]teINs. Each domain of the precursor protein is approximately 80 amino acid residues long with nearly identical placement of cysteine residues and glycosylation sites. Saposins A-D localize primarily to the lysosomal compartment where they facilitate the catabolism of glycosphingolipids with short oligosaccharide groups. The precursor protein exists both as a secretory protein and as an integral membrane protein and has neurotrophic activities.

Saposins A–D are required for the hydrolysis of certain sphingolipids by specific lysosomal hydrolases.

Family members
 Saposin A was identified as an N-terminal domain in the prosaposin cDNA prior to its isolation.  It is known to stimulate the enzymatic hydrolysis of 4-methylumbelliferyl-β-glucoside, glucocerebroside, and galactocerebroside.
 Saposin B was the first to be discovered and was found to be required as a heat-stable factor for hydrolysis of sulfatides by arylsulfatase A.  It is known by many different names, such as, sphingolipid activator protein-1 (SAP-1), sulfatide activator protein, GM1 ganglioside activator, dispersin, and nonspecific. It has been observed that this particular saposin activates many enzymes through interaction with the substrates not the enzymes themselves.
 Saposin C was the second saposin to be discovered and stimulates the hydrolysis of glycocerebroside by glycosylceramidase and galactocerebroside by galactosylceramidase.
 Saposin D is not well known to due lack of investigation at this point in time.  It was predicted from the cDNA sequence of prosaposin, like saposin A.  Enzymatic stimulation is very specific for this particular glycoprotein and it not understood completely.
 GM2A (GM2 ganglioside activator) has been viewed as a member of the SAP family and has been called SAP-3 (sphingolipid activator protein 3)

Structure
Every saposin contains about 80 amino acid residues and has six equally placed cysteines, two prolines, and a glycosylation site (two in saposin A, one each in saposins B, C, and D). Since saposins characteristics of extreme heat-stability, abundance of disulfide linkages, and resistance to most proteases, they are assumed to be extremely compact and rigidly disulfide-linked molecules.  Each saposin has an α-helical structure that is seen as being important for stimulation because this structure is maximal at a pH of 4.5; which is optimal for many lysosomal hydrolases.  This helical structure is seen in all (especially with the first region), but saposin has been predicted to have β-sheet configuration due to it first 24 amino acids of the N-end.

Function
They probably act by isolating the lipid substrate from the membrane surroundings, thus making it more accessible to the soluble degradative enzymes. which contains four Saposin-B domains, yielding the active saposins after proteolytic cleavage, and two Saposin-A domains that are removed in the activation reaction. The Saposin-B domains also occur in other proteins, many of them active in the lysis of membranes.

Clinical significance
Mutations in this gene have been associated with Gaucher disease, Tay–Sachs disease, and metachromatic leukodystrophy.

See also
 Saposin protein domain

References

Further reading

External links
 

Precursor proteins